Mustapha Ghorbal (born 19 August 1985) is an Algerian association football referee. He has been a full international referee for FIFA since 2014.

Career
Mustapha Ghorbal made his debut in the Algerian first division in 2011 and has been an international referee for the FIFA since 2014.

Statistics

Games and cards in Ligue Professionnelle 1

International matches
2019 FIFA U-20 World Cup in Poland
Poland vs Colombia (group stage).
Italy vs Japan (group stage).
Colombia vs Ukraine (quarter-finals).

2019 Africa Cup of Nations in Egypt.
Zimbabwe vs DR Congo (group stage).
Ivory Coast vs South Africa (group stage).
Uganda vs Senegal (round of 16).
Senegal vs Benin (quarter-finals).

2019 FIFA Club World Cup in Qatar.
Al-Sadd vs Hienghène Sport (first round)

2020 CAF Champions League Final in Cairo, Egypt.
Al Ahly vs Zamalek (final).

2021 FIFA Arab Cup in Qatar
Bahrain vs Kuwait (Qualification stage).

2021 Africa Cup of Nations in Cameroon.
Cameroon vs Burkina Faso (Group stage, opening match).
Mauritania vs Gambia (group stage)

2021 FIFA Club World Cup in United Arab Emirates.
Al-Jazira vs AS Pirae (first round)
Monterrey vs Al-Jazira (5th place)
Chelsea vs Palmeiras (final) as fourth official

2022 FIFA World Cup qualification (CAF) in Senegal
Senegal vs Egypt (Third stage, final)

2022 FIFA World Cup in Qatar
Netherlands vs Ecuador (group stage)
Australia vs Denmark (group stage)
Japan vs Croatia (round of 16) as fourth official
Croatia vs Brazil (quarter-finals) as fourth official

References

External links
Mustapha Ghorbal, WorldReferee.com

Living people
1985 births
Algerian football referees
2022 FIFA World Cup referees
FIFA World Cup referees
Sportspeople from Oran
21st-century Algerian people